Moses of Mardin (Latin: Moses Mardenus) was a Syriac Orthodox priest and bishop who played a significant role in printing the first Syriac bible and served as perhaps the first Syriac teacher/scholar in Europe.

Biography
Moses was born in the village of Qaluq near Mardin in the Tur Abdin region to a Syriac family. Moses is first mentioned in 1549 as an envoy of the Jacobite Patriarch of Antioch, Ignatius Abdullah I Stephan, to Rome to seek the means to print Syriac copies of the New Testament. His mission also included negotiations of unity with the Catholic Church in anticipation of the Patriarch's arrival.

Whilst in Rome, Moses stayed in the monastery of St Stephen of the Abyssinians where Johannes Potken had printed the first Ge'ez book, Psalterium David et Cantica aliqu. Here he printed a Syriac manuscript with the assistance of the Cardinals Marcello Cervini, Reginald Pole and Jean du Bellay. However the manuscript produced was defective as the printers did not understand the language.

In 1550, Moses travelled to Venice to meet Guillaume Postel to promote the idea of printing a Syriac copy of the New Testament which Postel had been working on since 1537. Despite this Postel could not help print it as he did not have the characters to print in Syriac.

In 1552, Moses then returned to Rome where he taught Syriac to Andreas Masius and Johann Albrecht Widmannstetter among others. Upon the advice of Masius, he left Rome in the company of Cardinal Pole as he was returning to England, to meet Johann Jacob Fugger in Augsburg. However, whilst staying in Dillingen he met Johann Albrecht Widmanstetter, then chancellor of the Austrian lands. Both sharing the same goals of printing a Syriac copy of the New Testament, Widmanstetter travelled with Moses to Vienna where they convinced Ferdinand I to fund their project. Thus one thousand copies of the Syriac version of the New Testament was printed in 1555 and Moses himself received half of which to distribute in the East.

Moses remained in Europe until 1562 before returning to the East; however before departing he sold 250 copies on the European market. In 1578, he is mentioned returning to Rome as a bishop accompanied by the deposed patriarch Ignatius Nemet Allah I. In 1581, Moses was appointed Professor of Syriac at the College of the Neophytes.

References 

Year of birth unknown
1592 deaths
16th-century births
16th-century Syriac Orthodox Church bishops
16th-century people from the Ottoman Empire
Oriental Orthodox bishops in the Ottoman Empire